Hills Ferry is a small unincorporated community of the northern San Joaquin Valley in Stanislaus County, California.

Geography

Hills Ferry is just west of the river mouth of the Merced River, at its confluence with the San Joaquin River.

History
Jesse Hill established Hill's Ferry in 1850, a ferry across the San Joaquin River just north of the Merced River's confluence, on the Mexican land grant Rancho Orestimba y Las Garzas.

In May 1868 Scottish botanist John Muir crossed here on his walk from Oakland to Yosemite. (Muir, John, “Rambles of a Botanist Among the Plants and Climates of California” (1872)

In 1888 the Southern Pacific Railroad established a new station nearby named Newman Station. The Simon Newman Company store building was in Hills Ferry, which later served as Fisher's Opera House until demolished in 1904.  In July 1906 a fire near Hills Ferry and Newman destroyed 2,500 acres of wheat and barley and 20,000 acres of pasture, along with hay, farm equipment and buildings.

References

Unincorporated communities in Stanislaus County, California
Merced River
Ferry transportation in California
History of Stanislaus County, California
Populated places established in 1850
1850 establishments in California
Unincorporated communities in California